Stuka, a German contraction of Sturzkampfflugzeug (dive bomber), usually refers to the German Junkers Ju 87 dive bomber of World War II.

Stuka or Stukas may also refer to:

Arts and entertainment
Stukas (film), a 1941 German war propaganda film
Orchestre Stukas, also known as the Stukas, a Congolese band of the 1970s
Stuka, a German Rock Against Communism band active 1990-1992
Stuka, a character in the Sin City series of stories

People
Stuka Jr. (born 1979), Mexican luchador enmascarado (masked professional wrestler)
Luiz Carlos Guedes Stukas (born 1980), Brazilian footballer

Other uses
Štuka, a village in North Macedonia
Stuka (horse), an American racehorse

See also
 
Wurfrahmen 40, a German World War II rocket launcher nicknamed the "Walking Stuka"
Shtuka, a sort of generalization of the mathematical Drinfeld module